Austin de Lone is an American keyboardist who records and tours with his own bands as well as with other artists, such as Bill Kirchen, Elvis Costello, Bonnie Raitt, Boz Scaggs, Nick Lowe, Commander Cody, and Loudon Wainwright.

Biography

Early Years
De Lone grew up in suburban Philadelphia, taking piano lessons at age 12. His early influences included Ray Charles and George Shearing. After stints as a student at the New England Conservatory of Music, Harvard University, and University of California, Berkeley, he moved to Greenwich Village. While at Harvard, de Lone composed the song "One for One," which was the first single released by Linda Ronstadt and the Stone Poneys.

Eggs over Easy
In 1969, de Lone formed the band Eggs over Easy with Jack O’Hara and Brien Hopkins. 
In 1970, Chas Chandler persuaded the band to record in London,  but those recordings were not released.

A  four-night-a-week residency at a pub called the Tally-Ho in Kentish Town lasted more than a year. Eggs over Easy played a blend of blues, country, and rock that became known as pub rock. Regular attendees of their shows included members of Brinsley Schwarz and BBC disc jockey John Peel. In 1972, they returned to California and released their first album Good 'N' Cheap produced by Link Wray.

The Moonlighters
De Lone moved to Marin, California in 1972, where he met Bill Kirchen, who had been performing with Commander Cody and His Lost Planet Airmen. In the late 70s, de Lone joined Kirchen's side-project band, the Moonlighters. Their 1983 album Rush Hour was produced by Nick Lowe. Both de Lone and Kirchen later worked with Lowe and Elvis Costello.

De Lone and Kirchen still record and perform together. In 2016, they released their duet album Transatlantica.

The Christmas Jug Band
De Lone is a member of the Christmas Jug Band, a collection of musicians who have been touring locally each holiday season since 1976, and releasing albums since 1987. The band has included musicians such as Dan Hicks, Tim Eschliman, Jim Rothermel, Lance Dickerson, Brien Hopkins, and Norton Buffalo.

Richard de Lone Special Housing Project
De Lone coordinates an annual fundraiser for eventual construction of the Richard de Lone Special Housing Project, a residential facility for people with Prader-Willi Syndrome, which de Lone's son Richard is afflicted with. As part of the 2007 event, Elvis Costello reunited with Clover, the band who backed him on his first album My Aim is True.

Personal life
De Lone and his wife Lesley live in Mill Valley, California. Their daughter Caroline de Lone is a singer, songwriter, and recording artist who has appeared with Buddy Miller and Bonnie Raitt.

Discography

Solo albums
 1991: De Lone At Last (Demon)
 2007: Soul Blues (Broken Toe)

As a member of Eggs over Easy
 1972, Good 'N' Cheap (A&M)
 1980: Fear of Frying (Squish)
 2016: Good ‘N’ Cheap: The Eggs Over Easy Story 3 LPs / 2 CDs (Yep Roc) compilation

As a member of the Moonlighters
 1983: Rush Hour (Demon) reissued by Globe Records in 2006
 2008: The Missing Moonlighters: Live/Studio Closet Tapes (Globe)

As a member of the Christmas Jug Band
 1988: Mistletoe Jam (Relix)
 1991: Tree-Side Hoot (Globe)
 1997: Rhythm On The Roof (Globe)
 2002: Uncorked (Globe)
 2009: On the Holiday Highway (Globe)

As composer
 1971: Grootna - Grootna (Columbia) - track 1, "I'm Funky" (co-written with Jack O'Hara and Al Silverman); track 3, "Going To Canada" (co-written with David Henry and Al Silverman); track 4, "Waitin' for My Ship" (co-written with Al Silverman); track 9, "Your Grandmother Loves You" / "I She It"  (co-written with David Henry)
 1973: James Montgomery Band - First Time Out (Capricorn) - track 2, "I'm Funky but I'm Clean" (co-written with Jack O'Hara and Peter Bell)

As primary artist/song contributor
 2016: various artists - Christmas on the Lam and Other Songs from the Season (Red House) - track 2, "Santa Claus Wants Some Lovin'" (with Bill Kirchen)

As producer
 1988: Commander Cody and His Lost Planet Airmen - Sleazy Roadside Stories (Relix)
 1990: Commander Cody and His Lost Planet Airmen - Aces High (Relix)

Also appears on
 1975: Loudon Wainwright III - Unrequited (Columbia)
 1978: Jesse Barish - Jesse Barish (RCA Victor)
 1980: Jesse Barish - Mercury Shoes (RCA)
 1986: Commander Cody - Let's Rock's (Blind Pig)
 1989: The Fabulous Thunderbirds - Powerful Stuff (Epic)
 1990: Nick Lowe - Party of One (Reprise)
 1991: The Fabulous Thunderbirds - Walk That Walk, Talk That Talk (Epic)
 1993: Jesse Colin Young - Makin' It Real (Ridgetop)
 1994: Boz Scaggs - Some Change (Virgin)
 1995: Tommy Castro - Exception to the Rule (Blind Pig)
 1996: Bill Kirchen - Have Love, Will Travel (Black Top)
 1999: Bill Kirchen - Raise a Ruckus (HighTone)
 2006: Sammy Hagar and the Wabos - Livin' It Up! (Rhino / Cabo Wabo)
 2006: Bill Kirchen - Hammer of the Honky Tonk Gods (Proper)
 2013: Liz Kennedy - Speed Bump (Clean White Shirt)
 2015: Mighty Mike Schermer - Blues in Good Hands'' (Vizztone)

References

External links 
 
 

1957 births
American rock keyboardists
Living people
Musicians from Pennsylvania
American session musicians
21st-century American keyboardists
20th-century American keyboardists
New England Conservatory alumni